The Cartwright Creek Bridge near Springfield, Kentucky is a metal truss bridge built in 1884.  It was listed on the National Register of Historic Places in 1989.

It is a single-span bridge built by the King Iron Bridge Company.  It crosses Cartwright Creek, a tributary to the Beech Fork of the Salt River. It was deemed significant as one of few truss bridges in Washington County surviving from the late 1800s.

See also 
 Beech Fork Bridge, Mackville Road nearby bridge also built by King Iron Bridge Co.
 National Register of Historic Places listings in Washington County, Kentucky

References

Road bridges on the National Register of Historic Places in Kentucky
Bridges completed in 1884
National Register of Historic Places in Washington County, Kentucky
Transportation in Washington County, Kentucky
1884 establishments in Kentucky
Truss bridges in the United States
Metal bridges in the United States